G.652 is an international standard that describes the geometrical, mechanical, and transmission attributes of a single-mode optical fibre and cable, developed by the  Standardization Sector of the International Telecommunication Union (ITU-T) that specifies the most popular type of single-mode optical fiber (SMF) cable.

History 
G.652 was originally developed in 1984 by ITU-T Study Group XV. Subsequently, revisions were published in 1988, 1993, 1997, 2000, 2003, 2005, 2009, and 2016 (from 1997 as Study Group 15).

Standard 
The standard specifies the geometrical, mechanical, and transmission attributes of a single-mode optical fibre as well as its cable. The fibre has zero-dispersion wavelength around 1310 nm as per how it was designed, however it can also be used in the 1550 nm wavelength region.

References 

ITU-T recommendations
ITU-T G Series Recommendations